Tayga is a rural locality (a village) in Yavgildinsky Selsoviet, Karaidelsky District, Bashkortostan, Russia. The population was 27 as of 2010. There are 3 streets.

Geography 
Tayga is located 43 km west of Karaidel (the district's administrative centre) by road. Deushevo is the nearest rural locality.

References 

Rural localities in Karaidelsky District